The 1993 Kroger St. Jude International was a men's tennis tournament held at the Racquet Club of Memphis in Memphis, Tennessee in the United States. The event was part of the Championship Series of the 1993 ATP Tour. It was the 23rd edition of the tournament and was held from February 8 through February 14, 1993. First-seeded Jim Courier won the singles title.

Finals

Singles
 Jim Courier defeated  Todd Martin 5–7, 7–6(7–4), 7–6(7–4)
 It was Courier's 2nd singles title of the year, and the 11th of his career.

Doubles
 Todd Woodbridge /  Mark Woodforde defeated  Jacco Eltingh /  Paul Haarhuis 6–4, 4–6, 6–3

References

External links
 ITF tournament edition details

Kroger St. Jude International
Sports in Memphis, Tennessee
U.S. National Indoor Championships
Kroger St. Jude International
Kroger St. Jude International
Kroger St. Jude International